All Is Yes is the 2008 (see 2008 in music) debut album by Get the Blessing (known as The Blessing at the time of its release), the jazz rock quartet based in Bristol, England. The album won best album at the 2008 BBC Jazz Awards.

Track listing
"Bleach Cake" – 2:59
"That Ain't It" – 5:23
"Another Brother's Mother" – 3:24
"Cake Hole" – 4:33
"Loubia" – 8:19
"Can't Believe in Faith" – 3:33
"Thermos" – 3:53
"Suki's Suzuki" – 3:23
"Equal and Opposite" – 5:14
"Small Fish, Small Pond" – 4:22
Note: "Equal and Opposite" has been mastered with a minute's silence at the end, making the track 6:14 in total. "Small Fish, Small Pond" is not listed.

Personnel
Jake McMurchie – saxophone, gong
Pete Judge – trumpet, glockenspiel
Jim Barr – double bass, bass guitar, vibraphone
Clive Deamer – drums

Guests
Adrian Utley – electric guitar ("That Ain't It")
Tammy Payne – vocals ("Loubia")
Gina Griffin – violin ("Loubia")

Technical
Recorded live at J&J Studios, Bristol, 2007
Mixed by Jim Barr
Mastered by Shawn Joseph

Release history
7 February 2008: Cake Music (Candid Records, CACD 78550)

References

2008 albums
Get the Blessing albums
Candid Records albums